Donna Yates may refer to:

 Donna Yates (EastEnders), fictional character
 Donna Yates (professor), archaeologist